Bjarni Stefánsson (born 2 December 1950) is an Icelandic sprinter. He competed in the 100 metres at the 1972 Summer Olympics and the 1976 Summer Olympics.

References

1950 births
Living people
Athletes (track and field) at the 1972 Summer Olympics
Athletes (track and field) at the 1976 Summer Olympics
Bjarni Stefansson
Bjarni Stefansson
Place of birth missing (living people)